François Valéry (real name : Jean-Louis Mougeot, born on 4 August 1954, in Oran, French Algeria) is a French singer-songwriter and composer.

Biography
He became famous for his romantic songs and his disco hits of the 1970s and for having composed and performed several soundtracks in the 1980s, following the success of "Dream in Blue", with Sophie Marceau. Valéry was also composer and producer of many songs for various artists (Michèle Torr, Line Renaud, Dalida, Jean Marais, Corinne Hermès, Jeane Manson, Hervé Vilard, Debbie Davis, Lova Moor...), series or films (Joy et Joan (1985), Les Nanas (1985), Les Grandes Marées (1993). He produced Patrick Fiori in the Eurovision Song Contest 1993 with "Mama Corsica". In 2001, he produced the musical L'Ombre d'un géant sung by Rose Laurens and Sophie Delmas. In 2003, he composed the official anthem of the France national rugby union team, "Standing Ovation".

Discography

Albums
1977 : 74-77 (Musidisc)
1979 : Chanteur pour filles de 16 ans
1980 : Emmanuelle
1981 : Chanson d'adieu
1981 : Dream in blue 
1983 : Elle danse Marie
1984 : Mon pote le DJ
1986 : Ma femme
1987 : Putain d'envie de vivre
1989 : Aimons-nous vivants
1990 : Chante pour les enfants
1991 : Tout est écrit
1992 : Vies Antérieures (compilation album)
1993 : Loin d'être un saint
1994 : Il est revenu le soleil (compilation album)
1997 : Qu'est-ce qu'on est con
2014 : Je suis venu te dire

Singles
 1973 : "Et puis c'est tout" (pseudonym : Claude Larra)
 1974 : "Une chanson d'été"
 1974 : "Le Prince d'amour"
 1975 : "Toutes les chansons d'amour sont tristes"
 1975 : "Lady Music"
 1976 : "Dormir avec toi"
 1976 : "Qu'est-ce qu'on a dansé sur cette chanson"
 1977 : "La Vieille musique"
 1977 : "Dînons ce soir en amoureux"
 1978 : "Laisse tomber"
 1978 : "La Loi d'amour"
 1979 : "Chanteur pour fille de 16 ans"
 1979 : "Disco Brasilia"
 1979 : "Tu as gagné je t'aime"
 1980 : "Chez Lola"
 1980 : "Emmanuelle"
 1980 : "Symphonie pour cœur brisé"
 1981 : "Chanson d'adieu"
 1981 : "Dream in Blue" (en duo avec Sophie Marceau)
 1982 : "Stars, le samedi soir"
 1982 : "Oran, juin 62"
 1982 : "Comme une poupée"
 1983 : "Joy" (soundtrack)
 1983 : "Elle était venue du Colorado"
 1983 : "Elle danse, Marie"
 1984 : "Mon pote le DJ"
 1984 : "Et dieu créa le rock"
 1985 : "La Femme qui danse"
 1985 : "Joy and Joan" (soundtrack)
 1985 : "Il voit la musique"
 1986 : "Comme Jimmy Dean"
 1987 : "Je sais que tu vis"
 1987 : "Putain d'envie de vivre"
 1988 : "Esclave de la musique"
 1989 : "Aimons-nous vivants" – #6 in France
 1989 : "C'est pas possible" – #32 in France
 1989 : "C'est la même chanson" – #20 in France
 1990 : "J'aime l'amour avec toi"
 1991 : "Qu'est-ce que je t'aime"
 1991 : "Tout est écrit"
 1992 : "Changer de vie"
 1992 : "Loin d'être un saint"
 1994 : "Il est revenu le soleil"
 1996 : "Cuba Cuba" – #43 in France
 1996 : "Que la musique nous éclaire"
 1997 : "Qu'est ce qu'on est con"
 1998 : "Au nom de toi"
 1998 : "Carmen" – #70 in France
 1999 : "Tout ce que j'aime"
 2005 : "Jouez Gitans"

Collaborations
 1988 : Liban (75 artistes pour le Liban)
 1989 : "Pour toi Arménie", charity single

References

1954 births
French composers
French male composers
French male singers
French-language singers
French pop singers
French singer-songwriters
Living people
People from Oran
French male singer-songwriters